Conscription in Vietnam has existed since 1975 and requires male citizens between the ages of 18 to 25 (18 to 27 for those who attend colleges or universities) to perform compulsory military service. Women are not required to perform military service, but they may voluntarily join the military.

General regulations 
According to Article 4 of the Military Service Law 2015 (effective from 1 January 2016):

 Military service is a glorious duty of citizens serving in the People's Army Vietnam. Performing military service includes active duty service and service in the reserve ranks of the People's Army of Vietnam.
 Citizens of military service age, regardless of ethnicity, social class, belief, religion, education level, occupation, or place of residence, must perform military service in accordance with regulations of this Law.
 Citizens serving in the Vietnam Coast Guard and joining the Vietnam People's Public Security are considered to have performed active military service.
 Citizens falling into one of the following cases are recognized to have finished active military service in peacetime:

 The core militia and self-defense force has completed the obligation to join the militia and self-defense force, of which at least 12 months have been on the duty of standing militia and self-defense force;
 Complete the task of participating in the Commune Police continuously for full 36 months or more;
 Cadres, civil servants, public employees, university graduates or higher who have been trained and conferred the rank of reserve officer;
 Young people who have graduated from universities, colleges or intermediate schools volunteer to serve at the economic - defense delegation for full 24 months or more according to the scheme decided by the Prime Minister;
 Citizens who have served on fishing vessels for full 24 months or longer.

Service length 
The de jure length of compulsory military service in Vietnam is 2 years. Unlike in South Korea and other countries or territories with compulsory military service, Vietnam have a fixed enlistment date on February or March every year. The de facto period usually ends before Tết two years after enlistment (e.g. if one's military service started in February 2020 (after Tết 2020), they will be discharged before Tết 2022)

In some cases, the Minister of the Ministry of Defence may decide to extend the active service period of non-commissioned officers and soldiers, but not exceeding 6 months:

 To ensure combat readiness;
 In the process of preventing and combating natural disasters, epidemics, rescue and rescue.

Exemptions 
These are exempt from military service:

 People with disabilities
 People with serious illnesses
 Mentally ill people
 People with chronic diseases

Salary, Allowances and Benefits

Controversies

Hazing

Unsuspicious cases 

 20 January 2004 – Private first-class Trần Văn Đại was attacked by six men from the Guards platoon of Regiment 209, Division 312, Corps 1st.
 November 2020 – Từ Văn Nghĩa, Vương Phước Tự, Nguyễn Hữu Nghĩa and Lê Văn Vĩnh, along with some other soldiers, voluntarily left the barracks to drink alcohol. When they were discovered by their superiors and asked to disperse and return to the barracks, these soldiers beaten their superiors and comrades.

Unusual or suspected unusual cases 
Since the effective of the Military Service Law 2015 (effective since 2016), there have been many deaths of draftees which their families or acquittances suspected them to be unusual:

See also 

 Military service

References 

Vietnam
Military of Vietnam